The Ilm is a  long river in Thuringia, Germany. It is a left tributary of the Saale, into which it flows in Großheringen near Bad Kösen.

Towns along the Ilm are Ilmenau, Stadtilm, Kranichfeld, Bad Berka, Weimar, Apolda and Bad Sulza.

In the valley of Ilm river runs the federal motorway 87 from Ilmenau to Leipzig and two railways: the Thuringian Railway between Großheringen and Weimar and the Weimar–Kranichfeld railway. Part of the Nuremberg–Erfurt high-speed railway also runs through the upper part of the valley near Ilmenau.

See also
List of rivers of Thuringia

Rivers of Thuringia
Rivers of Germany